Club Atlético Malagueño, shortened to Atlético Malagueño, is a Spanish football team based in Málaga, in the autonomous community of Andalusia. Founded in 1990, it is the reserve team of Málaga CF, and currently plays in Tercera Federación – Group 9, holding home games at Ciudad Deportiva Federación Malagueña de Fútbol, which has a capacity of 1,300 spectators.

Reserve teams in the Spain play in the same football pyramid as their senior team rather than a separate league. However, reserve teams cannot play in the same division as their senior team. Therefore, the team is ineligible for promotion to the division in which the first team competes. Reserve teams are also no longer permitted to enter the Copa del Rey.

History
The club was founded in 1990 as Sociedad Deportiva Malagueña, the reserve team of Club Atlético Malagueño. When the latter became Málaga CF in 1994, it changed its name to Málaga CF "B" the following year.

The B-team followed the first one as it moved up the different divisions and, at the end of 2002–03 was promoted to the second division where it would last three seasons, returning to the fourth level in 2007.

For the 2009–10 season onwards, Málaga B was renamed Atlético Malagueño.

Club names
As farm team
Sociedad Deportiva Malagueña (1990–95)

As reserve team 
Málaga Club de Fútbol, S.A.D. "B" (1995–2009)
Atlético Malagueño (2009–14)
Club Atlético Malagueño (2014– )

Season to season
SD Malagueña

As a reserve team

3 seasons in Segunda División
3 seasons in Segunda División B
19 seasons in Tercera División
2 seasons in Tercera Federación

Honours
Tercera División (3): 1998-99, 2016-17, 2017-18

Current squad
.

From Youth Academy

On loan

Current technical staff

Selected former coaches 
 José Mari Bakero 
 Francisco Carrasco
 Antonio Tapia
 Armando Husillos
 Dely Valdés

References

External links
Official website 
Futbolme team profile 
Club & stadium history Estadios de España 

Málaga CF
Football clubs in Andalusia
Spanish reserve football teams
Association football clubs established in 1990
1990 establishments in Spain
Segunda División clubs